- ("Subtract") is the upcoming fifth studio album by English singer-songwriter Ed Sheeran. It is set to be released on 5 May 2023 through Asylum and Atlantic Records.

Background
Sheeran announced the album title, tracklist and release date on 1 March 2023 through all social media platforms. He also announced a mini-European tour from 23 March to 2 April, to complement the release of the album's lead single. It was produced and co-written by Aaron Dessner of the indie rock band The National, who also produced Taylor Swift's Folklore (2020), and Evermore (2020). Sheeran and Dessner wrote over thirty songs together during a month-long studio session, which was eventually cut down to the album's fourteen tracks.

Track listing 
Track lengths taken from Qobuz.

Release history

References 

2023 albums
Upcoming albums
Ed Sheeran albums
Albums produced by Aaron Dessner
Asylum Records albums
Atlantic Records albums